Graduate House is a residential college and an academic and professional development meeting and gathering place in Melbourne, Victoria, Australia.

Location 
Graduate House is on Leicester Street, Carlton, just north of Melbourne’s CBD and in the heart of the education precinct between two major Melbourne-based universities –  The University of Melbourne (Australia’s top ranking university) and RMIT University (Australia’s most international university).

It overlooks University Square and neighbours Melbourne Business School, the Grattan Institute and Melbourne School of Engineering. It is across the park from Melbourne Law School, the Faculty of Business and Economics and the Melbourne Careers Centre in the Alan Gilbert Building; and down the road from Melbourne Graduate School of Education.

Graduate House is within walking distance of four major hospitals (The Royal Melbourne Hospital, The Royal Women’s Hospital, The Royal Children’s Hospital, and St Vincent’s Hospital), the Victorian Comprehensive Cancer Centre and major research institutes (e.g., The Peter Doherty Institute for Infection and Immunity, Walter and Eliza Hall Institute of Medical Research [WEHI], Florey Institute of Neuroscience and Mental Health, Murdoch Children's Research Institute, Bio21 Molecular Science and Biotechnology Institute and the National Ageing Research Institute).

Live at Graduate House 
Graduate House is the only dedicated graduate residential college in Victoria, Australia. The people who live at Graduate House are graduates – some are enrolled at a university in Melbourne at the postgraduate level (e.g., Masters by coursework, Research Masters or doctorate, professional doctorate, postgraduate diploma). Others are visiting academics who are undertaking sessional teaching and tutoring, researchers working in research institutes and universities, clinicians and consultants working in hospitals and other medical and public health facilities and those on sabbatical needing to focus for a few months on their specialist field.

Graduate House has  different room types for different preferences and budgets, ranging from single and double ensuite and non-ensuite rooms to self-contained apartments.

In a mature environment, graduate students pursue their studies, advance their career through living and meeting with colleagues from around the world, and make life-long friends. They also meet and network with renowned visiting academics, specialists and intellects from around the world and from all disciplines.

Graduate House provides meals, housekeeping and laundry facilities. 

Graduate House comprises three linked buildings along Leicester Street, and offsite bedsit single apartments in Barry Street and Barkly Place. The newest wing is the Stella Langford wing fronted by three terrace facades and holding three new conference and event rooms and luxury apartments. The middle section (main building) contains offices, conference rooms, and a restaurant and bar on the ground floor, together with three floors of rooms with separate bathrooms and a multi-story car park. The oldest section retains the comfort and elegance of its long history. It contains resident facilities (kitchen, dining room, lounge) together with a library and rooms with shared bathrooms.

Meet at Graduate House 
Graduate House has meeting and function spaces and services that can cater for numbers ranging from 2 to 300.

It is suitable for:

 meetings of all sizes - board, committee, planning, collaborations, staff, research, AGM, etc
 'hybrid' events - with some meeting face to face at Graduate House and others meeting online from all over the world.
 professional development - to enable compulsory PD, accreditation and micro-credentialing
 seminars, small conferences, satellite events for a larger conference
 functions - cocktail parties, dinners, working lunches and social gatherings

The types of groups that meet and hold functions at Graduate House include:

 charities and not-for-profits - as a charity itself, Graduate House knows the importance of providing a 'Ritz' experience at an affordable price
 university faculties, schools, research institutes and other groups - Graduate House is a hub where innovation and ideas come together and are translated into real life applications
 professional associations that provide continuing and compulsory professional development, seminars and presentations
 government departments - federal, state and local
 special interest groups - from all disciplines and backgrounds

Meeting and Function services

 catering - tailored, breakfast, morning tea, lunch (including working lunches), afternoon tea, cocktails and canapes, dinner
 COVIDSafe - adherence to and experience with capacity limits, physical distancing, hygiene, etc.
 Hybrid meeting capacity - good audio, video, tech support (in-house and for those online)
 Good service - friendly, reassuring, welcoming, high quality and professional
 Organisational membership - a more economical option for groups that convene multiple events
 Car parking - secure, cheap, online booking (and daily membership)
 Accommodation - delegates can choose to arrive the day before and stay overnight, clean, safe, quiet, meals included
 Office – temporary as needed rental enabling function organisers and delegates to prepare onsite for the event/function; single well-ventilated offices, and no sharing of airspace (lifts, bathrooms, open plan spaces) with multiple people

Membership Association 
Graduate House is owned and run by a membership association called The Graduate Union of The University of Melbourne Inc.

The Association is more than 110 years old and benefits graduates at any life stage. It is inclusive and egalitarian, and  enables networking of positive influence on careers, the mind and in developing collective projects.

The Members of this Association are graduates from all:

 universities - not just The University of Melbourne
 disciplines - from science, technology, engineering and mathematics, to medicine and allied health, law, business and economics through to the arts, languages, social sciences and creative industries.
 life stages and ages - with Members ranging in age from early 20s to early 100s
 ethnicity - Members are located all around the world and Resident Members are from all across Australia and the world
 beliefs, expressions, sides of politics and viewpoints.

Being part of this long-standing Association means contacts, networks, career development and social opportunities. Members are guaranteed to meet other intelligent, influential and well-connected people who are genuinely interested and active in supporting graduates at all life stages.

Divisions of membership include:

 non-resident members - from all over the world – some working in their professions, some taking career breaks, some in academia/research and others enjoying well-earned retirements
 Resident Members - from all over the world who live at Graduate House while undertaking post-graduate studies, research, professional development, teaching and tutoring, university business and sabbaticals
 Organisation/Group Members - who organise meetings and functions at Graduate House and/or online - seminars, conferences, lectures, professional development, board meetings, planning meetings and celebratory occasions.

Noting membership of The Graduate Union in a resume or curriculum vitae, on LinkedIn and with the other initials at the end of the qualification list, is beneficial as it indicates membership of a collegium that values lifelong learning, research, innovation and their productive application for global good.

History 
The Association celebrated its centenary in 2011, having originated on 4 May 1911 when a group of graduates met for the purposes of continuing to meet like-minded people after graduation. Unique for this time in Victoria, Australia, those meeting were of different disciplines, sexes, ethnicities, life stages and beliefs. From its origins, this Association was thus diverse - and it is this diversity that has enabled growth, generational membership, global influence, continued learning and quality improvements, and sustainability.

Less than two months after the first meeting, the Melbourne University Graduates Association was formed with Sir John Monash as its first president for the three years before he commenced his war service in 1914.

Following strong support from Sir Robert Menzies (who was the Association's treasurer in 1919), a substantial gift from Sir Sydney Myer and hard work by William (Bill) Berry, the Association purchased old terrace houses (Gladstone Terrace) in 1957. Barbara Funder, often referred to as the 'college mother' then joined staff, and worked tirelessly with Bill Berry to supervise the refurbishment of the terraces and the opening of Graduate House as a graduate-only residential college in 1962. With a further gift from Stella Langford in the late 1960s, three neighbouring terrace houses on Leicester Street were also purchased.

The college has since expanded significantly over the decades since. In 2005 the central four storey wing was built (replacing a farming equipment distribution warehouse). This central wing has a ground floor dining room and meeting and function spaces, and three floors of en-suite residential rooms. In 2010, the Stella Langford wing terraces were renovated to include ground floor meeting spaces, ten self-contained apartments and a secure car park. The Association has also purchased offsite bedsits in Barry Street (2016) and Barkly Place (2018).

References

External links

Residential colleges of the University of Melbourne
1911 establishments in Australia
Buildings and structures in the City of Melbourne (LGA)